The Lett Baronetcy, of Walmer in the County of Kent, was a title in the Baronetage of the United Kingdom. It was created on 31 January 1941 for Hugh Lett, President of the Royal College of Surgeons. The title became extinct on his death in 1964.

Lett baronets, of Walmer (1941)
Sir Hugh Lett, 1st Baronet (1876–1964)

Arms

References

External links
Royal College of Surgeons: Biography of Sir Hugh Lett

Extinct baronetcies in the Baronetage of the United Kingdom